Amato is a family name of Italian origin, meaning "beloved" or "dear one". Notable people with the surname include:

 Angelo Amato (born 1938), Roman Catholic titular archbishop
 Bert Amato (21st century), American inventor
 Chuck Amato (born 1946), American football coach
 Dave Amato (born 1953), American guitarist
 Donna Amato (living), American pianist
 Erika Amato (born 1969), American singer and actress
 Frank Amato (disappeared 1980, pronounced legally dead 1985), Sicilian-American mafioso 
 Gabriel Amato (born 1970), former Argentine footballer
 Gerardo Amato (born 1952),  Italian actor
 Giovanni Antonio Amato (1475-1555), Italian painter
 Giuliano Amato (born 1938), Italian politician
 Grant Amato (born 1989), American murderer
 Joe Amato (dragster driver) (born 1944), American dragster driver
 Joe Amato (poet) (born 1955) American writer and poet
 Joseph Amato (mobster) (died 1927), Italian-American mobster
 Ken Amato (born 1977), Puerto Rican American football player
 Kimberly Amato (born 1976), American actress
 Len Amato (21st century), American racecar driver
 Lou Amato (born 1963), Australian politician
 Mario Amato (1938-1980), Italian magistrate
 Michelle Amato (21st century), American vocalist
 Nancy M. Amato, American computer scientist 
 Pasquale Amato (1878-1942), Italian operatic baritone singer
 Phil Amato (living), American television journalist
 Pietro Amato (21st century), Canadian jazz horn player
 Raffaele Amato (1965), Italian Camorra boss 
 Sara Amato (born 1980), American professional wrestler better known as Sara Del Rey
 Serena Amato (born 1974), Argentine sailboat racer
 Silvio Amato (born 1961), Italian composer of classical, contemporary and popular music
 Stacey Pheffer Amato (born 1966), American politician 
 Vincenzo Amato (disambiguation), multiple people

Italian-language surnames